Quirindi was an electoral district of a Legislative Assembly in the Australian state of New South Wales from 1894 to 1904, named after Quirindi. The district was created when multi-member constituencies were abolished in 1894, and comprised the southern part of Tamworth and the south-eastern part of Gunnedah. The district was abolished in 1904 as a result of the 1903 New South Wales referendum, which reduced the number of members of the Legislative Assembly from 125 to 90, and partly replaced by Liverpool Plains.

Members for Quirindi

Election results

References

Former electoral districts of New South Wales
Constituencies established in 1894
1894 establishments in Australia
Constituencies disestablished in 1904
1904 disestablishments in Australia
New England (New South Wales)